Pennies from Heaven is a 1978 BBC musical drama serial written by Dennis Potter. The title is taken from the song "Pennies from Heaven" written by Johnny Burke and Arthur Johnston. It was one of several Potter serials (another being The Singing Detective) to mix the reality of the drama with a dark fantasy content, and the earliest of his works where the characters burst into extended performances of popular songs.

Overview
Hoskins became an established actor in the United Kingdom following his role in this serial. The serial was directed by Piers Haggard and produced by Potter collaborator Kenith Trodd. The series also featured Nigel Havers as Conrad Baker (the suave salesman), Jenny Logan as Irene (Joan's friend), Freddie Jones as Mr. Warner (Eileen's headmaster), Michael Bilton as Eileen's dad, Will Stamp as the Barman, Tudor Davies as the cafe customer (Davies was also choreographer for the series), and Peter Bowles as the Prosecuting Counsel.

Pennies was the last of Potter's television dramas to be filmed in the 'hybrid' format of studio videotape and location 16 mm film. The production involved six weeks of filming on location, most of it in Oxfordshire, with selected shooting in the Forest of Dean (in Potter's home county of Gloucestershire, between the River Severn and the River Wye). The school where Eileen teaches is the Forest school Potter attended in Berry Hill and the children who populate the school scenes were local children cast as extras. In temporary remission from his chronic condition of psoriatic arthropathy, a rare skin and joints disease that first afflicted him at the age of 24, Potter and his wife Margaret were able to visit the location shoot in Dean.

Pennies... was transmitted in six episodes of approximately 75 minutes each from 7 March to 11 April 1978, on BBC1 and first repeated later that year. In spring of the following year, Pennies won the British Academy Television Award for Most Original Programme (Hoskins & Campbell were also nominated for BAFTA acting awards). In a 2000 poll of industry professionals conducted by the British Film Institute to find the 100 Greatest British Television Programmes of the 20th century, Pennies from Heaven was placed at number 21.

Legacy
The original television version was released on DVD by BBC Worldwide in 2004. The first and sixth episodes have an audio commentary from Haggard and Trodd.

Potter's memorial service in November 1994 at St James's Church in Piccadilly began with those in attendance singing "Roll Along Prairie Moon" to the accompaniment of a jazz quintet. Cheryl Campbell and Freddie Jones read their scene in the schoolroom from Pennies: "As Jones stifled his tears, Campbell said: 'Nobody ever ever stops yearning' . . . In a comic interlude Michael Grade, chief executive of Channel 4, Alan Yentob, controller of BBC1, and Kenith Trodd, Potter's producer, read a scene from Pennies. [And Trodd] told of their last meeting before the playwright's death from cancer: 'Dennis slugging Courvoisier, fortified by liquid heroin and morphine . . . after an hour he seemed to crumple and he said, 'I do have one very real fear of death. It is that you might get asked to speak at my memorial service'."

Episodes

Film adaptation

In 1981, the series was adapted as a film, starring Steve Martin. Potter adapted his own screenplay, and Herbert Ross directed. Potter was nominated for the 1981 Academy Award for Writing Adapted Screenplay – according to The Times, Metro-Goldwyn-Mayer had him rewrite the script thirteen times. The movie was not successful at the box office, despite featuring Bernadette Peters (as Eileen), Christopher Walken (as Tom) and Vernel Bagneris (as 'the accordion man').

MGM required Potter to buy back his copyright from the BBC (according to the same 1990 Times article, Potter paid the BBC "something over $100,000" for the script), and prohibited broadcast of the BBC production of Pennies for approximately ten years. In 1989, Trodd was able to buy back the rights from MGM. The BBC promptly rebroadcast Pennies in February 1990.

See also
 Al Bowlly, song composer used extensively throughout the series.

References

Further reading

External links
 
 
 Entry on British Film Institute's Top 100 television programs
 Encyclopedia of Television
 British Film Institute Screen Online
 "Deep in Dennis Potter's Forest", The American Prospect magazine

1978 British television series debuts
1978 British television series endings
1970s British drama television series
BBC television dramas
BBC television musicals
1970s British television miniseries
Jukebox musicals
British musical television series
Television shows written by Dennis Potter
English-language television shows
Television series set in the 1930s